José Salvador Arco Frías (born October 25, 1984 in Navàs) is a Spanish professional basketball player. He currently plays for Cafés Candelas Breogán of the Spanish LEB Oro.

Honours 
Plus Pujol Lleida

LEB Catalan League Champion: 1
2008

Club Baloncesto Breogán

LEB Oro Champion: 1
2018
Copa Princesa Champion: 1
2018

References

1984 births
Living people
Bàsquet Manresa players
CB Breogán players
CB Canarias players
CB L'Hospitalet players
CB Vic players
Club Ourense Baloncesto players
Gipuzkoa Basket players
Liga ACB players
Melilla Baloncesto players
People from Bages
Sportspeople from the Province of Barcelona
Ratiopharm Ulm players
Small forwards
Spanish men's basketball players
Spanish expatriate basketball people in Germany
Basketball players from Barcelona